Arzviller is a commune in the Moselle department in Grand Est in northeastern France.

Its particularity lies in its Franco-German influences and its Germanic dialect, which make it, along with the other villages in the region, a cultural exception.

Geography 
Arzviller is located in the historic region of Lorraine and is part of the pays de Sarrebourg. 

The village is close to the Saint-Louis-Arzviller inclined plane and the rock of Dabo. It is an hour's drive from Strasbourg, Nancy and Metz thanks to its proximity to the A4 highway and the RN4.

Population

Cultural events and festivities 
Throughout the year, Arzviller is animated by the St. John's Eve celebrations, the messti, the Christmas market and many other cultural and sporting events.

See also 
 Saint-Louis-Arzviller inclined plane
 Communes of the Moselle department

References

External links
 

Communes of Moselle (department)